Watson was a software program released by Karelia Software for the Macintosh on November 27, 2001, which provided Internet content through a familiar Mac OS X-like interface through the use of plug-ins.

Plug-ins were programmed in the Objective-C language using the Cocoa frameworks, included with the Mac OS X operating system.

On September 18, 2002, Apple bundled a similar program, Sherlock 3, with Mac OS X v10.2. Advocates of Watson claim that Apple copied the features of Watson without permission, compensation, or attribution. Apple, however, claims that a Watson-like program was simply the natural evolution of Sherlock 2.

At Sun Microsystems' JavaOne conference in June 2004, Sun announced that they had licensed the Watson technology and were porting it to the Java programming language under the name Project Alameda. On October 5, development of the Cocoa-based version of Watson ceased. On November 24, Dan Wood, Karelia owner and Watson lead developer, made the last version of Watson available free of charge by posting a registration code on his blog.

See also
 Site-specific browser

References

External links 
Karelia: Watson FAQ - See "What is the relationship between Watson and the new Sherlock 3?".
Karelia: Developing Tools for Watson - See "How does Watson's plug-in architecture compare to Sherlock 3?".
Sun licenses search software for desktop push

Watson